Jerzy Andrzej Szmajdziński (9 April 1952 – 10 April 2010) was a Polish politician who was a Deputy Marshal of Polish Sejm and previously served as Minister of Defence. He was a candidate for President of Poland in the 2010 election.

Szmajdziński graduated from the Wrocław University of Economics. In the 1970s and 1980s he was an activist for the Federation of Socialist Unions of Polish Youth and the Socialist Union of Polish Youth, serving as its chairman from 1986–1989. He remained a member of Polish United Workers' Party from 1973 until its end in 1990. Later, he entered the leadership position of the Social Democracy of the Republic of Poland party. In December 1999, he became the deputy chairman of the Democratic Left Alliance (SLD).

He became a member of the Sejm in 1990, and in his second term Szmajdziński was chairman of the National Defense Committee and in the third term a deputy chairman of that commission. He was Minister of National Defence from 19 October 2001 to 2005. He was elected to the Sejm on 25 September 2005, gaining 20,741 votes in 1 Legnica district as a candidate from the SLD list.

On a national SLD convention in December 2009 he was chosen as the party's candidate in the 2010 presidential elections in Poland. His candidacy received 11% of the votes in March's pre-election poll.

Szmajdziński died on the day after his 58th birthday, in the  plane crash that also involved President Lech Kaczyński and 94 others.

Electoral history

Honours and awards
In 2002, Szmajdziński was made an honorary citizen of Jelenia Gora and in 2004 an honorary citizen of Bolków.

In 2004, he was appointed an honorary Knight Commander of the Order of the British Empire.

On 16 April 2010 he was posthumously decorated with the Commander's Cross with Star of the Order of Polonia Restituta. On the same day, the Parliament of the Province of Lower Silesia posthumously awarded him the title of Honorary Citizen of Lower Silesia. On 20 May 2010 Wrocław city council granted him the title of Honorary Citizen of Wrocław and on 28 March 2011 Legnica City Council gave him the title of Honorary Citizen of Legnica.

Private life
Married to Małgorzata. The couple has two children, Agnieszka and Andrzej.

See also
Members of Polish Sejm 2005–2007

References

External links
 
 Jerzy Szmajdziński – parliamentary page – includes declarations of interest, voting record, and transcripts of speeches.

|-

1952 births
2010 deaths
Democratic Left Alliance politicians
Polish Roman Catholics
Deputy Marshals of the Sejm of the Third Polish Republic
Members of the Polish Sejm 1991–1993
Members of the Polish Sejm 1993–1997
Members of the Polish Sejm 1997–2001
Members of the Polish Sejm 2001–2005
Members of the Polish Sejm 2005–2007
Members of the Polish Sejm 1985–1989
Interior ministers of Poland
Ministers of National Defence of Poland
Politicians from Wrocław
Polish United Workers' Party members
Commanders with Star of the Order of Polonia Restituta
Victims of the Smolensk air disaster
Members of the Polish Sejm 2007–2011
Wrocław University of Economics alumni
Honorary Knights Commander of the Order of the British Empire
Recipients of the Order of the White Star, 1st Class